The Far Rockaway–Mott Avenue station (announced as Far Rockaway station) is the eastern terminal station of the New York City Subway's IND Rockaway Line. Originally a Long Island Rail Road station, it is currently the easternmost station in the New York City Subway. It is served by the A train at all times.

, this station is the busiest subway station on the Rockaway peninsula. The original surface station on this site was opened in 1869; the current elevated station began operation as a subway station on January 16, 1958. The station was renovated between 2009 and 2012.

History

LIRR use
Until 1950 the Far Rockaway Branch of the Long Island Rail Road was part of a loop that traveled along the existing route. The line diverges from the present-day Atlantic and Long Beach Branches east of Valley Stream station in Valley Stream, New York. Eastbound trains continued south then southwest, through Five Towns and the Rockaway Peninsula, and onto a trestle across Jamaica Bay through Queens where it reconnected with the Rockaway Beach Branch; westbound trains did the reverse, using the Rockaway Beach Branch to cross the trestle, go through the Rockaways and Five Towns, and continue northeast then north to join the westbound Atlantic Branch.

Far Rockaway station itself was originally built by the Far Rockaway Branch Railroad, a subsidiary of the South Side Railroad of Long Island. Construction on the line began in September 1868, and the station was opened on July 29, 1869. The station was later converted into a freight house, when a second station was moved from Ocean Point Station (a.k.a. Cedarhurst Station), remodeled, and opened on October 1, 1881. The third depot opened on July 15, 1890, while the second depot was sold and moved to a private location in October 1890. The surface station featured a large plaza and depot, serving horse-drawn carriages, taxis, and surface trolleys. The Ocean Electric Railway terminated at the station between 1897 and September 2, 1926, and the station served as the headquarters for the Ocean Electric Railway.

The station also served as the terminus of a Long Island Electric Railway trolley line leading to Jamaica, via New York Avenue (now Guy R. Brewer Boulevard). Around noon on April 10, 1942, the surface station was closed, and a new elevated station on the current concrete trestle was opened as part of the Long Island Rail Road's grade crossing elimination project. This station had two low-level side platforms.

Subway use

There were frequent fires and maintenance problems on the Jamaica Bay viaduct. The most notorious of these problems was a fire in May 1950 between The Raunt and Broad Channel Stations. After this fire, the LIRR abandoned the Jamaica Bay viaduct and the Queens portion of the Rockaway Beach/Far Rockaway route. On June 11, 1952, the city acquired all trackage west of Mott Avenue, incorporating it as part of the IND Rockaway Line. Service provided by the A train over the line began in June 1956, with the full western spur to Rockaway Park operational. While the remainder of the line operated, with Beach 25th Street–Wavecrest serving as the eastern spur terminal, a new Far Rockaway subway station was constructed, opening on January 16, 1958.

The Far Rockaway LIRR station was moved to a grade-level station at Nameoke Street on February 21, 1958—two blocks from the original station and three blocks from the subway station—becoming the terminus of the Far Rockaway branch. The original site of the LIRR's elevated station and the bus depot, located on the northeast side of Mott Avenue, were replaced with a shopping center and parking lot, which began construction in 1960. The Far Rockaway Shopping Center, as it was called, started undergoing redevelopment in 2017 as part of the Far Rockaway rezoning; it was proposed to replace the shopping center with affordable housing.

In 1981, the MTA listed the Mott Avenue station among the 69 most deteriorated stations in the subway system, despite the fact that the station had become part of the subway system just two decades earlier. From 2009 to 2012, this and eight other stations were renovated for $117 million. At Far Rockaway, the 1950s design of the station house was replaced with metallic facades and a dome enclosure, and upgrading several features including staircases and employee areas. Elevators from the station house to the platforms were added, as were yellow tactile warning strips on the platform edges, making the station ADA-accessible. A glass artwork titled Respite was installed as part of the MTA's Arts for Transit program. The renovated station was unveiled on May 11, 2012.

Disputed age 
Far Rockaway is the oldest currently operating New York City Subway station, having originally opened  years ago, on July 29, 1869, as a Long Island Rail Road station. By contrast, the Gates Avenue station on the BMT Jamaica Line in Brooklyn is the oldest station to have been built specifically for rapid transit use, having opened in 1885 ( years ago). The Gates Avenue station is also the oldest continuously operating station in the subway system. The Far Rockaway station was converted from LIRR to subway loading gauges in 1958 and has only operated for  years in this capacity. Therefore, by that interpretation, Far Rockaway is actually the fifteenth newest station in the subway system (behind Grand Street; Harlem–148th Street; 57th Street; the three Archer Avenue Line stations; the three IND 63rd Street Line stations; the new South Ferry station; 34th Street–Hudson Yards; and the three Second Avenue Subway stations).

Station layout 

The Far Rockaway–Mott Avenue station, the Rockaway Line's eastern terminus, is built on a concrete viaduct and has two tracks and an island platform. The tracks end at bumper blocks just beyond the northeast end of the platform. The former track connection to the current LIRR's Far Rockaway station has been removed, and transferring now requires a walk of three blocks.

 The doors at the northeast end of the platform lead to stairs down to the street level fare control area. A tower and crew offices are at the southwest end. Two elevators and several staircases inside the station house lead to the platform level. A bodega called the "A Line Deli", previously called the "Last Stop Deli", is attached to the station entrance. It was originally a cafe, having been built along with the station in the 1950s.

References

External links 

 
 Station Reporter — A Rockaway
 The Subway Nut — Far Rockaway – Mott Avenue Pictures
 Trains Are Fun — Former Far Rockaway LIRR Station
 Mott Avenue entrance from Google Maps Street View
 Platform from Google Maps Street View

IND Rockaway Line stations
Rockaway, Queens
Former Long Island Rail Road stations in New York City
New York City Subway stations in Queens, New York
New York City Subway terminals
Railway stations in the United States opened in 1869
Railway stations in the United States opened in 1958
1869 establishments in New York (state)
1958 establishments in New York City